"Gravity Grave" is a song by the English rock band the Verve. It was released as the band's third single in the United Kingdom on 5 October 1992 by Hut Recordings. It reached number 196 on the UK Singles Chart.

"Gravity Grave" was recorded at Jacobs Studios in Farnham, Surrey. "Endless Life" was recorded at a studio in Ancoats, Manchester.

The cover was taken on Formby Beach, Merseyside, England. The man pictured on the cover is Tobyn Burnett. The cover was designed by Brian Cannon of Microdot and shot by Michael Spencer Jones.

Music video
The music video features the band in a 1973/74 Dodge Charger traveling through a rural setting and at one point stopping at a roadside cafe. Various locations in Hartlepool are featured, including the horseshoe tunnel in Steetley, although much of the previously industrial area has been redeveloped into housing since the video was shot. The video contains a mix of colored as well as black and white footage. The video ends with the car fading as it moves on down the open road. This Dodge Charger was destroyed at the Heinegone Banger Race in King's Lynn on 13 June 2015.

Track listing
 CD HUTCD 21
Gravity Grave (Extended Version) - 8:21
Endless Life - 5:32
A Man Called Sun (Live at Clapham Grand - 17/07/1992) - 5:29
Gravity Grave (Live Encore at Clapham Grand - 17/07/1992) - 2:35
 10" HUTEN 21
Gravity Grave (Edit)
Endless Life - 5:32
She's a Superstar (Live at Clapham Grand - 17/07/1992)
 12" HUTT 21
Gravity Grave (Extended Version) - 8:21
Endless Life - 5:32
A Man Called Sun (Live at Clapham Grand - 17/07/1992)

External links
Music video

The Verve songs
1992 singles
Hut Records singles
1992 songs
Songs written by Richard Ashcroft
Songs written by Simon Jones (musician)
Songs written by Peter Salisbury
Songs written by Nick McCabe

de:No Come Down#Gravity Grave beim Glastonbury '93